Thénia is a district in Boumerdès Province, Algeria. It was named after its capital, Thénia which, under French rule, was called Ménerville.

Municipalities
The district is further divided into 4 municipalities:
Thénia
Souk El-Had
Beni Amrane
Ammal

Villages
The villages of Thénia District are:

Zawiya

 Zawiyet Sidi Boushaki

History

French conquest

 Battle of Thénia (1837), a battle during the French conquest of Algeria.
 First Battle of the Issers (1837), a battle during the French conquest of Algeria.
 Battle of Thénia (1846), a battle during the French conquest of Algeria.
 Battle of Thénia (1871), a battle during the Mokrani Revolt of Algeria.

Algerian Revolution

 Ferme Gauthier

Salafist terrorism

 2007 Souk El Had bombing (13 February 2007)
 2008 Thénia bombing (29 January 2008)
 2008 Beni Amrane bombings (9 June 2008)
 2010 Ammal bombing (11 June 2010)
 2012 Thénia bombing (11 January 2012)

Rivers

This district is crossed by several rivers:
 
 
 
 
 
 Isser River
 
 
 Meraldene River

Dams

This district has two dams:
 Meraldene Dam
 Beni Amrane Dam

Football clubs

Notable people

References

Districts of Boumerdès Province
Thénia